Trifluoromethylisocyanide is the chemical compound with the formula CF3NC.  It is an isocyanide and a fluorocarbon. Polymerisation occurs even at temperatures below its boiling point of -80 °C. As a ligand in coordination chemistry, this species behaves similarly to carbon monoxide.

The compound trifluoracetonitrile (CF3CN) is an isomer to trifluoromethylisocyanide.  The nitrile is more stable, as is the usual case.

References

Isocyanides
Trifluoromethyl compounds